The 1997 Italian Grand Prix was a Formula One motor race held at Autodromo Nazionale di Monza, Monza on 7 September 1997. It was the thirteenth round of the 1997 Formula One season. The 53-lap race was won by David Coulthard driving for McLaren after starting from sixth position on the grid. Jean Alesi finished second for Benetton after starting from pole position, while Heinz-Harald Frentzen finished third for Williams.

Report

Qualifying
Fisichella set the early pace in qualifying. Alesi got pole position on his second set of tyres. Frentzen moved into second late in the session. The rest of the top six was Fisichella third, Villeneuve fourth, Häkkinen fifth and Coulthard sixth. The Ferraris of Michael Schumacher and Eddie Irvine qualified ninth and tenth respectively.

Race
At the start Alesi led with Frentzen in second and Coulthard moving from sixth on the grid into third place. The top three stayed this way until lap 28 when Frentzen pitted. On lap 32 Alesi and Coulthard pitted together, when Coulthard moved ahead of Alesi courtesy of a faster pit-stop. This left Mika Häkkinen in the lead until he pitted a couple of laps later. Coulthard took the lead on lap 34 when Michael Schumacher pitted. The top three after Michael Schumacher pitted was Coulthard first, Alesi second and Frentzen third. Häkkinen was fourth until he got a puncture on lap 36. The top six after Häkkinen's puncture was Coulthard first, Alesi second, Frentzen third, Fisichella fourth, Villeneuve fifth and Michael Schumacher in sixth. The top six stayed in that order for the rest of the race and was won by Coulthard by just under two seconds. This was the only race of the season where neither Jacques Villeneuve nor Michael Schumacher was on the podium.

Post-race
David Coulthard dedicated his win in this race to Princess Diana, who had been killed in a road accident the week before.

Classification

Qualifying

Race

Championship standings after the race
Bold text indicates who still has a theoretical chance of becoming World Champion.

Drivers'   Championship standings

Constructors'   Championship standings

 Note:   Only the top five positions are included for both sets of standings.

References

External links

Italian Grand Prix
Italian Grand Prix
Grand Prix
Italian Grand Prix